Robert Bruce Cowick (born August 18, 1951) is a Canadian former professional ice hockey forward who played parts of three seasons in the National Hockey League (NHL) with the Philadelphia Flyers, Washington Capitals and St. Louis Blues.

Playing career
Cowick was born in Victoria, British Columbia. He began his career with the Philadelphia Flyers during the 1974 Stanley Cup playoffs, helping them win the Stanley Cup. He was left exposed for the 1974 NHL Expansion Draft and was claimed by the Washington Capitals. On October 17, 1974, the Capitals won their first game in NHL history, with Cowick picking up an assist. After playing a full season with the Capitals he was placed on waivers again and was claimed by the St. Louis Blues.  He played five games with the Blues during the 1975–76 season and after finishing the season with the Providence Reds of the AHL, Cowick retired from professional hockey, and became a Victoria police officer.

Career statistics

References

External links
 

1951 births
Living people
Canadian ice hockey forwards
Sportspeople from Victoria, British Columbia
Philadelphia Flyers players
Providence Reds players
Richmond Robins players
St. Louis Blues players
San Diego Gulls (WHL) players
Stanley Cup champions
Undrafted National Hockey League players
Washington Capitals players
Ice hockey people from British Columbia